Amalgamated Footwear and Textile Workers' Union of Australia was a short-lived Australian trade union, which existed between 1987 and 1992. The union represented workers employed in the manufacture of textiles as well as footwear and felt hatting products.

Formation 

The Amalgamated Footwear and Textile Workers Union was formed in 1987 through the merger of the Australian Textile Workers' Union and the Australian Boot Trade Employees' Federation.

Amalgamation 

In 1992 the union finalised a merger with the Clothing and Allied Trades Union of Australia to form the Textile, Clothing and Footwear Union of Australia. It is industry union for all workers in the apparel industry.

References

External links 
 tcfua.org.au

Defunct trade unions of Australia
Textile and clothing trade unions
Trade unions established in 1987
Trade unions disestablished in 1992
1987 establishments in Australia
1992 disestablishments in Australia